Dalipebinau is a village and municipality in the state of Yap, Federated States of Micronesia.  It lies on the west side of the Yap island, north of Yap International Airport.

References
Statoids.com, retrieved December 8, 2010

Municipalities of Yap